Wächter (Guards or Guardians, also singular) is a series of large outdoor iron sculptures by Anatol Herzfeld, a student of Joseph Beuys who was both a traffic policeman and an artist, with a recurring theme. The sculptures are located at various places in Germany. One of them watches over a positive change in the environment, another is a monument to policemen killed in the line of duty.

Background 
Anatol Herzfeld was born in Insterburg, East Prussia (now Chernyakhovsk, Russia) on 21 January 1931. During World War II, he and his family escaped to the Rhineland, where he first was a blacksmith and then a policeman. Teaching traffic rules to school children using puppets was one of his specialties. He studied sculpture at the Kunstakademie Düsseldorf with Joseph Beuys from 1964 to 1972. As an artist, he was known as Anatol. In 1982, he settled on the Museum Island of Hombroich near Düsseldorf, running a studio in a former barn.

In a radio feature about Anatol, the function of the Wächter has been described as watching, defending and enlightening. Anatol is quoted:

Sculptures 
Several of Anatol's monumental outdoor sculptures are called Wächter (Guards or Guardians), early ones also Eisenmänner (Iron Men):
 Eisenmänner / Wächter (1993), Museum Insel Hombroich, Neuss
 Wächter der Goitzsche (2000), Bitterfeld
 Die Wächter der Kinder (2002), Viersen
 Wächter, Neuss, inner court of the town hall
 Wächter (2010/2011), Selm-Bork

Wächter der Goitzsche 
Wächter der Goitzsche (Guards of the Goitzsche) is the title of a group of up to ten large figures by Anatol. The park was renaturalised from a former brown coal mining area, and the Wächter watch over the process.

Die Wächter der Kinder 

Die Wächter der Kinder (The Guardians of the Children) is a group of iron figures located at the Casinogarten park in Viersen.

Wächter 
Wächter (Guard) is an iron sculpture of one large figure with surrounding glacial erratics (Findlinge), placed in 2011 at the Landespolizeischule in Selm-Bork, a training and convention centre for the police, as a monument for police officers from North Rhine-Westphalia who were killed in the line of duty.

See also 
 Guardian stones

References

External links
 

1993 sculptures
2000 sculptures
2002 sculptures
2011 sculptures
Iron sculptures
Outdoor sculptures in Germany
Monuments and memorials in Germany